Astrothelium zebrinum is a species of corticolous (bark-dwelling) lichen in the family Trypetheliaceae. Found in Guyana, it was formally described as a new species in 2016 by André Aptroot. The type specimen was collected in a sclerophyllous forest near the airstrip of Kaieteur Falls National Park (Potaro-Siparuni Region). Characteristics of the lichen include its fused ostioles, lack of lichen products, and ascospores that have seven septa and dimensions of 14–28 µm wide by 60–70 µm long.

References

zebrinum
Lichen species
Lichens described in 2016
Lichens of Guyana
Taxa named by André Aptroot